This is a list of notable Puerto Ricans who were awarded the Presidential Medal of Freedom. The list includes people who were born in Puerto Rico, people who are of full or partial Puerto Rican ancestry such as Pablo Casals, whose mother was Puerto Rican and Chita Rivera, whose father was Puerto Rican. It also includes other residents and/or immigrants of other ethnic heritages who have made Puerto Rico their home, and who are recognized for their life and/or work.

Nine Puerto Ricans have been awarded the Presidential Medal of Freedom. The Presidential Medal of Freedom is an award bestowed by the President of the United States and is—along with the comparable Congressional Gold Medal bestowed by an act of U.S. Congress—the highest civilian award in the United States. It recognizes those individuals who have made "an especially meritorious contribution to the security or national interests of the United States, world peace, cultural or other significant public or private endeavors". Former governor Luis A. Ferré and his sister Isolina Ferré are the only pair of Puerto Rican brother and sister to have been awarded the Presidential Medal of Freedom. Baseball Hall of Famer Roberto Clemente was also the posthumous recipient of the Congressional Gold Medal and the Presidential Citizens Medal.

Recipients of the Presidential Medal of Freedom
The following people are the recipients of the Presidential Medal of Freedom:

See also

 List of Puerto Ricans
 List of Puerto Rican Presidential Citizens Medal recipients
 List of Presidential Medal of Freedom recipients
 List of volunteer awards
 Puerto Rican recipients of the Medal of Honor
 Puerto Rican recipients of the Navy Cross
 Puerto Rican recipients of the Distinguished Service Cross
 History of women in Puerto Rico

References

Lists of people from Puerto Rico
Presidential Medal of Freedom recipients